Ashok Kumar Rana is a veteran Indian politician from Western Uttar Pradesh, associated with the Bharatiya Janata Party. He  is a member of the 18th Legislative Assembly and has earlier been part of the Seventeenth Legislative Assembly of Uttar Pradesh representing the Dhampur assembly constituency.

He is a two-time M.L.A from Dhampur and one-time MLA from Seohara.

Political career
Ashok Kumar Rana has been a member of the 10th, 15th and 17th Legislative Assembly of Uttar Pradesh. Since 2017, he has represented the Dhampur (Assembly constituency) and is a member of the Bhartiya Janata Party. He defeated [Samajwadi Party] candidate Mool Chand Chauhan by a margin of 17,864 votes.

Posts held

References 

People from Bijnor district
Bharatiya Janata Party politicians from Uttar Pradesh
Uttar Pradesh MLAs 2017–2022
Uttar Pradesh MLAs 2022–2027
Living people
1960 births
Bahujan Samaj Party politicians from Uttar Pradesh